The 2007–08 ULEB Cup was the sixth season of the second-tier level European professional club basketball competition, the EuroCup, which is organized by Euroleague Basketball S.L. It was also the last season for the competition under the name of ULEB Cup. The EuroCup is the European-wide league level that is one tier below the EuroLeague level. On July 2, 2008, EuroLeague Basketball S.L. and FIBA Europe announced that the competition would be renamed to the Eurocup, starting with the 2008–09 season.

For the first time, 54 teams competed.  The Final Eight was held from April 10, to April 13, in Turin, Italy, in the  Palavela arena.  The trophy was won by the Spanish club DKV Joventut, with the other finalist being another Spanish team, Akasvayu Girona.  Dynamo Moscow took third place.

Teams of the 2007–08 ULEB Cup

Teams details

Format
For the first time in its short history, this season's ULEB Cup featured a total of 54 teams, divided into 9 groups of 6 teams. The round-robin group stage was followed by knock-out stages, until the last 8 remaining teams met in the competition's first ever Final Eight tournament. Just as in the previous season, the official broadcast partner of the ULEB Cup was Eurosport. The regular season began in November 2007.

Regular season

All 54 teams in 9 groups (in each group 6 teams) played a round-robin competition (home and away). 3 teams from each group advanced to the Knockout stage (Sixteenth-finals). The 5 teams with the best results advanced, as did the fourth place in the group also advanced to the Playoff.

Top 32 

A draw was held to determine the eighth-finals match-ups. Each round was played as two games (home and away) to advance to the next stage. The winners were determined by points difference. Draws in the first games were possible. Example: UNICS 86, Real 80, first game. Real 99, UNICS 80, second game. Points difference, UNICS 166-179, Real win.

Top 16 

The winners from the Sixteen-finals advanced to the eighth finals. The games were played as two games (home and away). The winners were determined by points difference.

Final eight

The winners of the eighth finals played the Final Eight. It was held from April 10 to April 13.

Regular season

Group I

Top 32 

The draw to determine a bracket for the elimination rounds of the 2007–08 ULEB Cup was held on Monday, January 28, 2008, at 13:30 CET in the Museu Olimpic i de l'Esport in Barcelona.

|}

Top 16 

|}

Final eight

Quarter finals  
April 10, Palavela, Turin

|}
April 11, Palavela, Turin

|}

Semi finals 
April 12, Palavela, Turin

|}

3rd place game 
April 13, Palavela, Turin

|}

Final 
April 13, Palavela, Turin

|}

Finals MVP
 Rudy Fernández (DKV Joventut)

External links
2007–08 ULEB Cup @ Eurocupbasketball.com

 
Uleb
2007-08